Suman Pokhrel (born on September 21, 1967) is a Nepali poet, lyricist, playwright, translator and artist. Universities in Nepal and India have included his poetry in their syllabus.

Suman Pokhrel is the sole writer to receive the SAARC Literary Award twice. He received this award in 2013 and 2015 for his own poetry and his contributions to poetry and art in general in the South Asian region.

Early life 
Suman Pokhrel was born on September 21, 1967 in Mills Area, Biratnagar, to Mukunda Prasad Pokhrel and Bhakta Devi Pokhrel. 

Suman Pokhrel attended Bal Mandir, a government owned Kindergarten in Biratnagar, until he was five. Pokhrel got moved to his ancestral village of Kachide in Dhankuta at the age of seven and raised there by his paternal grandmother. His paternal grandfather Bidhyanath Pokhrel was a poet and a politician. He was introduced to literature early through the influence of his grandfather's library, filled with Nepali, Hindi and classic Sanskrit literature. At the age of twelve, he moved back to Biratnagar to live with his parents. Pokhrel was mentored by his father, who was an engineer by profession and a bibliophile with a keen interest in art and literature.

Education 
Pokhrel earned his BSc, MBA and BL from the Tribhuvan University, Nepal.

Career 
Suman Pokhrel joined the Nepali civil service in Nepal Government as a Section Officer in February 1995. He left the job and joined Plan International in December 1998 as a development activist and went to the remote hilly region of the country. The job demanded visits to the more remote areas of the region.

A Multilingual poet, Suman Pokhrel has written in Nepali, English, Hindi and Urdu languages. Whereas, his works have been translated into several other languages, and are published in magazines and journals from across the countries. Many of his works have been translated into other languages by various translators including himself.

Pokhrel has read his poems for both national and international audiences. He has read his poems in SAARC Festivals of Literature in 2009, 2010, 2011, 2013 and 2015. He read his poem in SAARC Charter Day Celebrations on December 8, 2013 in New Delhi, India as an especial invitee. He recited his poems in Nepali during a monthly two-poet poetry recital program in Kathmandu in March 2015. He read his poems at All India Poets' Meet in Orissa, India in February 2016 as an especial invitee poet from foreign country.

Works 
As a translator, Pokhrel has translated works of several poets and writers from around the world into Nepali. He has translated William Shakespeare's play The Tempest into Nepali as Aandhibehari which was published by Nepal Academy in 2018. His translations of poetry of Anna Akhmatova, Anna Swir, Allen Ginsberg, Delmira Agustini, Forough Farrokhzad, Gabriela Mistral, Jacques Prévert, Mahmoud Darwish, Nazik Al Malaika, Nazim Hikmet, Nizar Qabbani, Octavio Paz, Pablo Neruda, Yehuda Amichai. and Sylvia Plath, are collected in Manpareka Kehi Kavita, an anthology of poetry in Nepali translation. His translations of fifty one of Kannada Language poets including Kuvempu, G. S. Shivarudrappa, D. R. Bendre, V. K. Gokak, U. R. Ananthamurthy, Siddalingaiah, P. Lankesh, K. S. Nissar Ahmed, Chandrashekhar Patil, Baraguru Ramachandrappa, Doddarange Gowda, Chennaveera Kanavi, Sumatheendra R Nadig, H. S. Venkateshamurthy, Gopalakrishna Adiga, Allama Prabhu, Manu Baligar, S. R. Ekkundi and Jayant Kaikini are collected in anthology titled Shashwat Awaj. Other prominent poets that he has translated into Nepali include Faiz Ahmad Faiz, Sahir Ludhiyanvi, Atal Bihari Vajpayee, Langston Hughes, Maya Angelou, Gulzar and Uday Prakash among others. Ajit Cour, Indira Dangi, Sheema Kalbasi, Anamika, Kalpna Singh-Chitnis Azita Ghahreman and Hélène Cardona are other contemporary writers and poets whom he has translated into Nepali. Pokhrel's Nepali translations have been considered as among a few best literary translations brought into Nepali.

Suman Pokhrel has translated works of many of Nepali-language poets and writers including Laxmi Prasad Devkota, Gopal Prasad Rimal, Bhupi Sherchan, Ishwar Ballav, Abhi Subedi and Krishna Bhooshan Bal into English, Hindi and Urdu.

Poetry
 Shoonya Mutuko Dhadkanbhitra
 Hazaar Aankhaa Yee Aankhaamaa
 Jeevanko Chheubaata
 Malai Zindagi Nai Dukhdachha
 Soundryako Sangeet

Play
 Yajnaseni

Translation
 Aandhibehari
 Manpareka Kehi Kavita
 One Zero One
 Bharat Shashwat Aawaz

Awards

International
 SAARC Literary Award 2015 – conferred by Foundation of SAARC Writers and Literature
 SAARC Literary Award 2013 – conferred by Foundation of SAARC Writers and Literature

National

 Aarohan Bishesh Samman 2013 - conferred by Aarohan Gurukul

References

External links 
 
 Official Website of Suman Pokhrel

 
1967 births
Living people
People from Biratnagar
Nepalese male poets
Nepalese artists
Nepali-language poets
English-language poets
Hindi-language poets
Urdu-language poets
Sanskrit poets
Lyric poets
Nepalese dramatists and playwrights
Nepali-language writers
English-language writers
Maithili writers
Hindi-language writers
Nepalese translators
Nepalese songwriters
Artist authors
Translators to Nepali
Translators to English
Translators to Hindi
Translators to Urdu
Translators from English
Translators from Nepali
Translators from Hindi
Translators from Urdu
20th-century Nepalese poets
21st-century Nepalese poets
Tribhuvan University alumni
20th-century translators
20th-century Nepalese male writers
21st-century male writers
People from Morang District
People educated at Adarsha High School
Nepali-language lyricists
Literary translators
English–Nepali translators
Translators of Anna Akhmatova
Translators of Delmira Agustini
Translators of Forough Farrokhzad
Translators of Gabriela Mistral
Translators of Mahmoud Darwish
Translators of Nâzım Hikmet
Translators of Nizar Qabbani
Translators of Octavio Paz
Translators of Pablo Neruda
Translators of William Shakespeare
Multilingual poets
English-language poets from Nepal
English-language writers from Nepal